Neil Andrew Warwick Angus (born 24 March 1961) is a former Member of the Victorian Legislative Assembly, representing the electoral district of Forest Hill. He was elected in 2010, and subsequently reelected in the 2014 and 2018 elections, before being defeated at the 2022 Victorian state election. While in Parliament, Angus variously held the shadow portfolios of Citizenship and Multicultural Affairs, Consumer Affairs, and Assistant Treasurer.

Early life and education 
Angus underwent his high school education at Carey Baptist Grammar School. His tertiary education includes a Bachelor of Business in Accounting from Swinburne University of Technology, and a Graduate Certificate in Financial investment from Edith Cowan University.

Angus worked as a Registered Company Auditor from 1992-2010 and a Certified Fraud Examiner from 2005–2012.

Politics
Angus finished runner-up to Alan Tudge in the Liberal preselection ballot for the Division of Aston prior to the 2010 federal election.

State parliament
Angus was first elected in 2010 and re-elected in 2014 and 2018.

He served as a Shadow Minister from 2018 to 2021, but was dropped from the shadow minister on Matthew Guy’s return to the Liberal leadership.

In 2022, Angus was the only member of the Legislative Assembly who was not vaccinated against COVID-19, stating in late 2021 that he was ‘unwilling’ to have the vaccine, despite scientific consensus and official support from the Liberal opposition for vaccinations. Seeking preselection ahead of the 2022 election, Angus lobbied Liberal Party members to postpone the vote, to avoid him being excluded from it after unvaccinated people were banned from attending.

At the 2022 Victorian state election, Angus ran for the newly created seat of Glen Waverley after his seat, Forest Hill, was abolished in the 2021 redistribution. He was defeated by Labor’s John Mullahy.

Personal life 
Neil is married, has four children, and three grandchildren.

References

External links
 Parliamentary voting record of Neil Angus at Victorian Parliament Tracker

1961 births
Living people
Politicians from Melbourne
Liberal Party of Australia members of the Parliament of Victoria
Members of the Victorian Legislative Assembly
People educated at Carey Baptist Grammar School
Swinburne University of Technology alumni
Australian accountants
21st-century Australian politicians